The New Bangalore Football Stadium was the informal name of the new football stadium which was to be constructed in Bangalore, Karnataka for the 2017 FIFA U-17 World Cup which was held in India. The stadium was supposed to be constructed on the same spot as the current Bangalore Football Stadium after the current one was demolished. The stadiums construction was to be handled by Ozone Group who also owned the local club, Ozone FC. Bengaluru FC were also supposed to play at the stadium after the U-17 World Cup ends.

History
On 5 December 2013, after FIFA officially announced that India would be the hosts of the 2017 FIFA U-17 World Cup, the country's first FIFA international competition. It was also announced that Bengaluru would be among the choices for being a host city for the tournament. In March 2014 it was announced that at the end of the 2013–14 I-League season the stadium would be demolished and then a new stadium would be built on that exact spot. Prerana Bhat from Samved academy said that The stadium will reportedly have a capacity between 25,000 and 45,890.

References

Bengaluru FC
Football venues in Karnataka
Sports venues in Bangalore
Proposed sports venues in India
2017 establishments in Karnataka
Sports venues completed in 2017